Hjalmar Ekdal (born 21 October 1998) is a Swedish professional footballer who plays as a defender for  club Burnley. Beginning his professional career with IK Frej in 2018, he briefly represented Assyriska FF, Hammarby IF, and IK Sirius before signing with Djurgårdens IF in 2021. A full international since 2022, he has won three caps for the Sweden national team.

Club career

Early career
Ekdal was born in Stockholm and started to play football with IF Brommapojkarna as a youngster. In 2017, he left to club to study in the United States and play college soccer for UNC Wilmington Seahawks. While in the US, he played in 20 games and scored two goals as the Seahawks reached the final of the 2017 CAA Men's Soccer Tournament before losing 2–4 to William & Mary Tribe.

IK Frej
In May 2018, Ekdal returned to his native country and signed a two-year deal with IK Frej in Superettan, Sweden's second tier. He played 15 league games throughout the year, scoring once, as the club finished 9th in the table. Ekdal also made one appearance out on loan with Assyriska FF in Division 1, the third tier.

In 2019, Ekdal had a major breakthrough and established himself in the starting eleven at IK Frej. He played all 30 league games in Superettan during the season, scoring twice, but was unable to save the club from relegation.

Hammarby IF
On 19 July 2019, Ekdal transferred to Hammarby IF in Allsvenskan, signing a two-year deal. It was also announced that he would remain eligible for affiliated club IK Frej for the rest of the season. On 3 March 2020, Ekdal was sent on loan to fellow Allsvenskan club IK Sirius for the remainder of the season.

Djurgårdens IF 
On 4 January 2021, Ekdal joined Djurgårdens IF on a four-year contract. He was named the Allsvenskan player of the month for the month of September 2021.

Burnley
On 21 January 2023, Ekdal joined Championship leaders Burnley on a four-and-a-half year deal for an undisclosed fee.
Ekdal earned his debut appearance for the Clarets on 4 February 2023 against Norwich City in the EFL Championship, in which he scored his first Burnley FC goal in the 60th minute.

International career

Youth 

Ekdal was called up to the Sweden under-19 national team in October 2018, and featured in two friendlies against Denmark (3–1 win) and Russia (1–1 draw) the same month. He was called up to the Sweden U21 team for the first time on 26 August 2020.

Senior 
Ekdal was called up to the Sweden national team for the first time on 1 December 2021, for two friendlies against Finland in January 2022. However, the friendlies were cancelled two weeks later because of the COVID-19 pandemic. Ekdal was once again called up to the national team on 18 May 2022, for Sweden's 2022–23 UEFA Nations League games against Slovenia, Norway, and Serbia in June 2022.

He made his full international debut for Sweden on 9 June 2022 in the UEFA Nations League game against Serbia, playing the full 90 minutes at centre back in a 0–1 loss.

Personal life
He is the son of journalist Lennart Ekdal and the brother of fellow footballer Albin Ekdal, who represents Spezia and the Swedish national football team.

Career statistics

International

Honours 
Individual

 Colonial Athletic Association's Men's Soccer – Rookie of the Year: 2017
 Colonial Athletic Association's Men's Soccer – All-Rookie Team: 2017
 All-Colonial Athletic Association – First Team: 2017
 NCCSIA University Division All-State Men's Soccer – First Team: 2017
 Colonial Athletic Association Men's Soccer – Player of the Week: 28 August–3 September 2017
Allsvenskan Player of the month: September 2021
Allsvenskan Defender of the year: 2021

References

External links

1998 births
Living people
Association football forwards
Swedish footballers
Allsvenskan players
Superettan players
IF Brommapojkarna players
IK Frej players
Hammarby Fotboll players
IK Sirius Fotboll players
Djurgårdens IF Fotboll players
Burnley F.C. players
Sweden youth international footballers
Footballers from Stockholm
Swedish expatriate footballers
Expatriate footballers in England
Swedish expatriate sportspeople in England